The following is a list of episodes for the animated Adult Swim television series,  Superjail!, along with descriptions for each episode. The episodes are ordered chronologically by airdate for each season. There have been 37 episodes in total.

The first season of Superjail! was released on DVD in the United States on February 23, 2010, and the second season of Superjail! was also released on DVD in the United States on March 13, 2012.  The third season was released on July 23, 2013.

Series overview

Episodes

Pilot (2007)

Season 1 (2008)

Season 2 (2011)

Season 3 (2012)

Season 4 (2014)

Notes

References

External links
 
 
 

Superjail!
Superjail!